The Panteón de los Próceres (Spanish for Heroes' Pantheon) is a crypt inside the old Church of the Real Convictorio de San Carlos (Royal College of San Carlos) that holds the remains of the heroes of the Peruvian War of Independence.

The Church originally belonged to the Jesuit novitiate of San Antonio Abad, but it was transferred after the Jesuits were expelled from Spanish territories. The Church was rebuilt after the 1746 Lima–Callao earthquake leveled Lima, and in 1876 it became the Chapel of the Universidad Nacional Mayor de San Marcos. In 1924, the remains of various heroes of the wars of independence (1821-1824) were transferred to a crypt just under the altar and the Church was renamed "Panteón de los Proceres".

This "Panteón de los Proceres" should not be confused with the "Panteón de los Proceres" at the Presbítero Maestro cemetery. The "Panteón de los Proceres" at the Presbítero Maestro cemetery holds the remains of the heroes of the War of the Pacific of 1879.

Murals

The Pantheon has murals by José Sabogal.

Characters

Here the remains of 24 independence heroes and 41 effigies are preserved.

Remains

Among the remains of heroes are:

 Ramón Castilla
 Hipólito Unanue
 Pascual Saco Oliveros
 José Andrés Rázuri
 José Bernardo Alcedo
 José de la Torre Ugarte
 Martin George Guisse
 Guillermo Miller
 Francisco Vidal
 Domingo Nieto
 Juan Espinosa de los Monteros
 Mariano Necochea
 Juana de Dios Manrique
 Narciso de la Colina

Effigies

Among the effigies are:

 José de San Martín
 Simón Bolívar
 Túpac Amaru II
 Micaela Bastidas
 Guillermo Miller

External links
 

Buildings and structures in Lima
National University of San Marcos
Cultural heritage of Peru